Kersey is a village and civil parish in the Babergh district in Suffolk, in the east of England. The main street has a ford across a stream. Its principal claim to fame is that a coarse woollen cloth called Kersey cloth takes its name from it. The cloth was presumably originally made there, but later in many other places too.

The parish contains the village of Kersey and the hamlets of Kersey Tye, Kersey Upland, Wicker Street Green and William's Green. Kersey's church is St Mary's, and the village also contains a primary school.

The population of the parish at the 2011 Census was 359.

The village is known for its picturesque main street with medieval timber-framed houses and a ford of a tributary of the River Brett known locally as "The Splash".

The village has been used as a filming location including for Lovejoy, Magpie Murders and the advert launching the Austin Metro.

Notable residents
Robert Gordon-Finlayson (1881-1956), Adjutant-General to the Forces; he was created a Knight Commander of the Order of the Bath in 1937, Companion of the Order of St Michael and St George in 1918, and Companion of the Distinguished Service Order in 1915.
Lewis Lyne, (1899-1970), a Major-General who served before and during World War II and was created a Companion of the Order of the Bath in 1945 and Companion of the Distinguished Service Order in 1943.
Hammond Innes (1913–1998), novelist.
Peter Vansittart (1920-2008), novelist.

Related pages
Kersey (cloth)
Kersey Priory
St Mary's Church, Kersey

Location grid

References

External links

Parish Council website
Kersey in Pictures

 
Villages in Suffolk
Civil parishes in Suffolk
Babergh District